Nelson Corporation Tramways operated a tramway service in Nelson, Lancashire between 1903 and 1934.

History
The tramway was authorised by the Nelson  Light Railway Order of 1901

The tramway route ran along the Leeds Road from the town centre to the boundary with Colne (to connect with the Colne and Trawden Light Railway. It also connected with the Burnley Corporation Tramways network. There was also a branch line, from Scotland Road to Higherford Bridge.

Electricity was supplied from Nelson power station. 

In 1912, the company obtained two low height tramcars which could pass underneath the low bridge carrying the railway in Colne, and through services to Colne were initiated.

In 1924, the Barrowford section of the tramway was relaid after a proposal to substitute with buses was rejected.

Fleet

The company livery was red and white. Eight vehicles were purchased as follows:
1-6 Brush Electrical Machines, Loughborough1903. Double deck trams.
7-8 Electric Railway and Tramway Carriage Works, Preston 1903. Single deck trams.
9 Electric Railway and Tramway Carriage Works, Preston 1904 Single deck tram.
10-11 United Electric Car Company, Preston, 1912. Double deck low height trams.

Closure

The system closed on 6 January 1934.

References

Tram transport in England
Nelson, Lancashire
Transport in the Borough of Pendle
Historic transport in Lancashire
4 ft gauge railways in England